Ruthvoes is a village in mid Cornwall, England, United Kingdom.

The village lies on the northwest edge of Goss Moor near the A30 dual carriageway trunk road. The Par to Newquay branch railway passes south of the settlement.

Ruthvoes is the location of the holy well of Saint Columba the virgin and, according to legend, is where she was beheaded.

Notable people
Richard Bullock, miner, stockbroker; guard on the Deadwood stagecoach; born at Ruthvoes

References

Villages in Cornwall
Holy wells in Cornwall
St Columb Major